Man and Beast may refer to:
 Man and Beast (1963 film), a West German-Yugoslavian war film
 Man and Beast (1917 film), an American silent adventure film

See also
 Men and Beasts, a 1962 Soviet-German drama film